Thomas James Arthern (24 September 1868 – 1947) was an English footballer who played in the Football League for Stoke.

Career
Arthern was born in Stoke-upon-Trent and started his career with Hanley Town before joining Stoke in September 1891. He played in one match for Stoke during the 1891–92 season which came in a 3–1 defeat at home to Wolverhampton Wanderers. He re-entered local football with Congleton.

Career statistics

References

English footballers
Stoke City F.C. players
English Football League players
1868 births
1947 deaths
Association football forwards